Frank Dale Abell (July 26, 1878 – November 21, 1964) was a bank executive, government official, and politician. He was a Republican who served on the Morris County, New Jersey Board of Chosen Freeholders from 1913 to 1925, in the New Jersey General Assembly in 1925 and 1926 and the New Jersey Senate from 1926 to 1931. Abell was the treasurer of the Federal Farm and Loan Association from 1915 to 1918.

Career
Abell was the son of Erastus Corning Abell, a financier with Richard P. Herrick & Company, and had three siblings. He was born in Morristown, New Jersey where he attended local schools. He worked in a finance company, as an assistant postal clerk, and in 1898 joined the First National Bank of Morristown.

Abell became president of the bank in 1930. In 1944, the bank merged with the National Iron Bank and he became chairman of both banks. Abell served in this capacity until 1963, and also served as an official of the Greystone Park State Hospital, the Morristown Y.M.C.A., and the Morris County Grange. He was a director of the Jersey Central Power and Light Company. A collection of his papers in at the Morristown and Morris Township libraries' genealogy center.

Personal life
Abell married Elvira Dean in 1918. Together they had two children, Alice Dean Abell (Caulkins) and Frank Dale Abell, Jr. Abell died on November 21, 1964. He was buried at the Evergreen Cemetery in Morristown.

References

1878 births
1964 deaths
County commissioners in New Jersey
Republican Party New Jersey state senators
Republican Party members of the New Jersey General Assembly
People from Morristown, New Jersey
American bankers
20th-century American politicians